Intimal hyperplasia is the thickening of the tunica intima of a blood vessel as a complication of a reconstruction procedure or endarterectomy. Intimal hyperplasia is the universal response of a vessel to injury and is an important reason of late bypass graft failure, particularly in vein and synthetic vascular grafts.

See also 
 Hyperplasia
 Medical grafting

References

External links
"Intimal hyperplasia, the obstacle in bypass grafts"

Diseases of arteries, arterioles and capillaries